The following is a list of notable people assassinated by the Liberation Tigers of Tamil Eelam, commonly known as Tamil Tigers or as LTTE.
The LTTE is a now-defunct militant organisation that was based in northern Sri Lanka, which fought for a separate Tamil state in the north and east of Sri Lanka between 1983 and 2009. The LTTE was decisively defeated by the Sri Lankan Military in May 2009 and it has been banned by 33 countries, including the United States, United Kingdom, Canada, India, Malaysia, Sri Lanka and the 27 member nations of the European Union. At the height of its power, the LTTE possessed a well-developed militia and carried out many high-profile attacks, including the assassinations of an Indian prime minister, Sri Lankan president and several other high-ranking Sri Lankan politicians. Some of the notable people who survived the assassination attempts of LTTE, are also included at the bottom of this list.

Heads of state and government
 Ranasinghe Premadasa - Former President of Sri Lanka
 Rajiv Gandhi -  Former Prime Minister of India

Government ministers
 Lalith Athulathmudali - Former Sri Lankan Cabinet Minister of Trade, National Security, Agriculture, Education and deputy minister of defence.
 Gamini Dissanayake - Former United National Party presidential candidate and Leader of the Opposition, Former Sri Lankan Cabinet Minister of Irrigation, Power, Highways, Land, Land Development, Plantation Industries, Mahaweli and Mahaweli Development & Former chairman of the Sri Lanka Cricket Board
 Ranjan Wijeratne - Former Sri Lankan Cabinet Minister of Foreign Affairs, Plantation Industries and Minister of State for Defense
 Lakshman Kadirgamar Former Sri Lankan Cabinet Minister of Foreign Affairs of Sri Lanka, Prominent Tamil diplomat, politician and lawyer.
 Jeyaraj Fernandopulle - Former Sri Lankan Cabinet Minister of Highways & Road Development, the chief government whip of the parliament of Sri Lanka
 C. V. Gunaratne - Former Sri Lankan Cabinet Minister of Industries Development.
 Weerasinghe Mallimarachchi - Former Sri Lankan Cabinet Minister of Food, Co-operative, and Janasaviya-Poverty Alleviation
 G. M. Premachandra - Former Sri Lankan Cabinet Minister of Labour and Vocational Training
 D. M. Dassanayake - Former Sri Lankan non-cabinet Minister of Nation Building

Members of Sri Lankan parliament
 Ossie Abeygunasekera - Former Chairman and Leader of the Sri Lanka Mahajana Pakshaya, Former candidate of the Presidential election in 1989
 A. Amirthalingam - Leading Sri Lankan Tamil politician and former Leader of the Opposition.
 A. Thangathurai- Former Tamil United Liberation Front (TULF) Member of Parliament for Trincomalee District.
 Alfred Duraiappah - Former Sri Lanka Freedom Party member of the parliament for Jaffna District and former mayor of Jaffna.
 M. Canagaratnam Former Tamil United Liberation Front MP for Pottuvil
 A. L. Abdul Majeed - Former Sri Lanka Freedom Party MP for Mutur
 S. Shanmuganathan Former Democratic People's Liberation Front MP for Vanni District
 Nimalan Soundaranayagam - Former Tamil United Liberation Front MP for Batticaloa District
 Sam Tambimuttu Former Eelam People's Revolutionary Liberation Front MP for Batticaloa District
 Neelan Tiruchelvam -  Scholar, international activist, legislator, lawyer, social scientist and politician. Former Member of the Sri Lanka Parliament from National List
 G. Yogasangari - Former Eelam People's Revolutionary Liberation Front MP for Jaffna District
 V. Yogeswaran Former Tamil United Liberation Front MP for Jaffna district

Senior military and police officers
 Admiral Clancy Fernando - Former Commander of the Sri Lanka Navy
 Lieutenant General Denzil Kobbekaduwa - General Officer Commanding, Northern Sector, Sri Lankan Army
 Lieutenant General Parami Kulatunga - Deputy Chief of Staff, Sri Lankan Army
 Lieutenant Generall Nalin Angammana - General Officer Commanding, 3rd Army Division, Sri Lankan Army
 Major General Lucky Wijayaratne - Former Commander, 22 Brigade, Sri Lanka Army
 Major General Larry Wijeratne -Former Brigade Commander, 51-4 Brigade
 Major General Lakshman Algama - Former Chief of Staff of the Sri Lanka Army
 Major General Vijaya Wimalaratne - Former Commander of Jaffna, Sri Lanka Army
 Major General Percy Fernando - Former Deputy General Officer Commanding, 54 Division, Sri Lanka Army
 Major General Ananda Hamangoda - Former Brigade Commander, 51-2 Brigade, Sri Lanka Army
 Major General Susantha Mendis - Former Brigade Commander, 51-4 Brigade
 Major General Janaka Perera - Former Chief of Staff of the Sri Lanka Army, Former High Commissioner to Australia & Ambassador to Indonesia, Former opposition leader of the North Central Provincial Council
 Rear Admiral Mohan Jayamaha - Former Commander, Northern Naval Area, Sri Lanka Navy
 Air Commodore Shirantha Goonatilake - Former Commanding Officer of No. 1 Flying Training Wing, Sri Lanka Air Force
 Colonel Tuan Nizam Muthaliff - Former Commanding Officer, 1st Battalion, Military Intelligence Corps, Sri Lanka Army
 Senior Deputy Inspector General T. N. De Silva - SDIG, Colombo Range, Sri Lanka Police
 Senior Superintendent of Police Chandra Perera - Former SSP, Jaffna
 Assistant Superintendent of Police Ivan Boteju - Former Assistant Superintendent, Kalmunai, Sri Lanka Police

Prelates
 Kithalagama Sri Seelalankara Thera -  Chief incumbent of the Dimbulagala Raja Maha Vihara, former Chief Sangha Nayake of Northern and Eastern provinces
 Hegoda Sri Indrasara Thera - Chief incumbent of Vidyananda Maha Pirivena - Ampara, former Chief Sangha Nayake of Northern and Eastern provinces
 Sivashri Kungaraja Kurukkal - Former head pandit of the Koneswaram temple of Trincomalee
 Selliah Parameswaran Kurukkal - Chief Pujari of the Santhiveli Pilleyar Kovil, Batticaloa

Activists and journalists
 Chelvy Thiyagarajah - Founder of feminist journal called Tholi, International PEN award winner in 1992
 Balanadarajah Iyer -  Sri Lankan Tamil activist, writer and poet
 Kethesh Loganathan - Tamil political activist, Human Rights advocate and deputy secretary general of the Secretariat for Coordinating the Peace Process (SCOPP).
 Rajani Thiranagama - University lecturer, Tamil human rights activist and feminist
 Relangi Selvarajah -  Tamil broadcaster and actress.

Others
 C. E. Anandarajah - Sri Lankan educationist and former principal of St. John's College, Jaffna.
 V. M. Panchalingam - Leading Sri Lankan Tamil civil servant and former District Secretary of Jaffna
 S. Nadarajah -  Sri Lankan Tamil lawyer, politician and former member of the Senate of Ceylon.
 Sarojini Yogeswaran - Former Mayor of Jaffna
 Gopalaswamy Mahendraraja - Former Deputy leader of the LTTE
 Uma Maheswaran - Founder of the People's Liberation Organisation of Tamil Eelam.
 Kumaraswamy Nandagopan - Former president of the Tamil Makkal Viduthalai Pulikal

Attempted assassinations
 Chandrika Kumaratunga - Former  president of Sri Lanka
 Maithreepala Sirisena - Former president of Sri Lanka, Former minister of Health and Agriculture
 Field Marshal Sarath Fonseka - Eighteenth Commander of Sri Lankan Army
 Gotabhaya Rajapaksa - Former President of Sri Lanka, Former Secretary of the Ministry of Defence, Sri Lanka
 Douglas Devananda - Leader of the Eelam People's Democratic Party
 Nimal Siripala de Silva - Current Minister of Transport in the Parliament of Sri Lanka

Notes

References 

Liberation Tigers of Tamil Eelam attacks in the Sri Lankan Civil War
LTTE
Liberation Tigers of Tamil Eelam
Liberation Tigers of Tamil Eelam
Assassinated, LTTE
Sri Lanka, LTTE
Sri Lankan Civil War-related lists